Água Doce do Maranhão is a municipality in the state of Maranhão in the Northeast region of Brazil.

The municipality contains part of the  Delta do Parnaíba Environmental Protection Area, created in 1996.

See also
List of municipalities in Maranhão

References

Municipalities in Maranhão